Pontrilas, Saskatchewan was a Canadian town that no longer exists. There were four grain elevators, small stores, and services. Around the center were homes and a two-room school for grades 1 to 12. When the school closed, the students were sent to Codette and Nipawin; the school's merry-go-round was sent to Codette. There was a hotel, which has burned down.

The community was named for Pontrilas in Herefordshire, near the border with Wales.

References

Ghost towns in Saskatchewan
Nipawin No. 487, Saskatchewan